Ri Pyong-chol is a North Korean former footballer. He represented North Korea on at least one occasion in 2010.

Career statistics

International

References

Date of birth unknown
Living people
North Korean footballers
North Korea international footballers
Association footballers not categorized by position
Year of birth missing (living people)